The 1992 Cupa României Final was the 54th final of Romania's most prestigious cup competition. The final was played at the Stadionul Regie in Bucharest on 24 June 1992 and was contested between Divizia A sides Steaua București and Politehnica Timişoara. The cup was won by Steaua on penalties.

Route to the final

Match details

References

External links
 Official site 

Cupa Romaniei Final, 1992
Cupa României Finals
FC Steaua București matches
Cupa Romaniei Final 1992